Logunovium nigricostum es una polilla de la familia Erebidae. Fue descrito por William Jacob Holland en 1893. Se encuentra en Cameroon, el Democratic Republic of the Congo, Gabon, Ghana, Nigeria, Senegal y the Gambia.

References

Spilosomina
Moths described in 1893